Newhall is a village (at ) and civil parish in the unitary authority of Cheshire East and the ceremonial county of  Cheshire, England. The village lies 3½ miles to the west of Audlem and 5 miles to the south west of Nantwich. The parish also includes the village of Aston (at ), and the small settlements of Aston Heath, Barnett Brook, Brown's Bank, Dodd's Green, Grandford, Grindley Green, Hollingreen, Kingswood Green, Maiden Estate, Salesbrook, Sheppenhall and part of Sandford. Nearby villages include Audlem and Wrenbury.

According to the 2001 census, the parish had a population of 669, increasing to 776 at the 2011 Census.

Governance
Newhall is administered by Newhall Parish Council. From 1974 the civil parish was served by Crewe and Nantwich Borough Council, which was succeeded on 1 April 2009 by the unitary authority of Cheshire East. Newhall falls in the parliamentary constituency of Eddisbury, which has been represented by Edward Timpson since 2019, after being represented by Stephen O'Brien (1999–2015) and Antoinette Sandbach (2015–19).

Geography and transport

The A530 and A525 roads run north–south and east–west, respectively, through the parish.

Landmarks
The industrial enterprises of Aston Mill and New Primebake are located in the parish. St Andrew's Methodist Chapel is in the village of Aston and has a small cemetery; there is a former Methodist church in Dodd's Green. The Bhurtpore Inn, an award-winning public house listed in The Good Pub Guide, is found in Aston.

Aston House Farm is a black-and-white timber-framed farmhouse in Aston that dates from 1662; it is listed at grade II.

See also

Listed buildings in Newhall, Cheshire

References

External links

Civil parishes in Cheshire
Villages in Cheshire